William Zock (January 26, 1918 – April 29, 1988) was a professional Canadian football offensive lineman who played for the Toronto Argonauts and the Edmonton Eskimos from 1937 to 1954. He was part of five Grey Cup championships with the Argonauts and another one with the Eskimos. He was inducted into the Canadian Football Hall of Fame in 1985.

External links
 https://web.archive.org/web/20071208040800/http://www.argonauts.ca/Argos/History/HallOfFame/Bill_Zock.html
 https://www.findagrave.com/memorial/7955673

1918 births
1988 deaths
Canadian Football Hall of Fame inductees
Canadian football offensive linemen
Edmonton Elks players
Ontario Rugby Football Union players
Players of Canadian football from Ontario
Canadian football people from Toronto
Toronto Argonauts players
Toronto Balmy Beach Beachers players